The Delta Rhythm Boys was an American vocal group active from 1934 to 1987.

The group was formed at Langston University in Langston, Oklahoma, in 1934 by Carl Jones, Traverse Crawford, Otha Lee Gaines, and Kelsey Pharr. They moved to Dillard University in New Orleans, Louisiana, in 1936 and worked there under Frederick Hall as the Frederick Hall Quintet and the New Orleans Quintet.

They performed on radio programs such as Amos and Andy and The Joan Davis Show, and performed on Broadway in the shows Sing Out the News and Hot Mikado. The group appeared extensively in 15 films. They resettled permanently in Europe in 1956.

Lee Gaines died of cancer in Helsinki, Finland on July 15, 1987. At Gaines's funeral(On July 22nd, 1987), Hugh Bryant collapsed while performing, and died, apparently from a heart attack.

Personnel 
Bass
 1934–1987: Lee Gaines

First tenor
 1934–1944: Elmaurice Miller
 1940–1944: Clinton Holland
 1944–1960: Carl Jones
 1960–1974: Herb Coleman
 1974–1987: Walter Trammell

Second tenor
 1934–1975: Traverse Crawford
 1975–1987: Ray Beatty

Baritone
 1934–1940: Joseph "Essie" Adkins
 1940–1943: Harry Lewis
 1943–1960: Kelsey Pharr
 1951–1954: Cliff Holland (temporary replacement for Pharr)
 1962–1987: Hugh Bryant

Deaths 
Kelsey Pharr died on April 20th, 1961.(He had fallen ill and entered a hospital prior)

Elmaurice Miller died on September 13th, 1962, at the age of 59.

Clinton Holland died In August of 1968, at the of 51.

On June 12, 1974 in Cannes, France, Herb Coleman and Delta Rhythm Boys members had just left the casino Palm Beach where they had just played their jazz classics when they saw a Frenchman playing Russian roulette in the street. Herb Coleman wanted to prevent the young man from playing with the revolver. The man then turned the weapon against the singer and fired, killing Herb Coleman. The man, a 29-year-old French barber, was drunk. He was arrested and charged with murder.

Traverse Crawford died on July 26th, 1975, at the age of 59.

Harry Lewis died In August of 1984, at the age of 69.

Joseph "Essie" Adkins died on August 21st, 1990, at the age of 81.

Clifford Holland died on  September 26th, 1990, at the age of 71.

Carl Jones died on September 21st, 2010, at the age of 91.

References

External links
The Delta Rhythm Boys at the Vocal Group Hall of Fame website
The Delta Rhythm Boys at Doo Wop Nation
Jason Gross. Carl Jones Interview. Furious.com. January 2001.

American vocal groups
Musical groups from Oklahoma
Musical groups established in 1934
Langston University
RCA Victor artists
1934 establishments in Oklahoma